The 1965 Yerevan demonstrations took place in Yerevan, Armenia on April 24, 1965, on the 50th anniversary of the Armenian genocide. It is said that this event constitutes the first step in the struggle for the recognition of the Armenian genocide of 1915.

On April 24, 1965, for the first time for any such demonstration in the entire Soviet Union, 100,000 protesters held a 24-hour demonstration in front of the Opera House on the 50th anniversary of the commencement of the Armenian genocide, and demanded that the Soviet Union government officially recognize the Armenian genocide committed by the Young Turks in the Ottoman Empire, and build a memorial in Armenia's capital city of Yerevan to perpetuate the memory of the victims of the Armenian genocide.

The posters said "Just solution to the Armenian question" and other nationalistic slogans concerning Western Armenia, Karabakh and Nakhichevan.

To the shouts of "our land, our lands" the major demonstration marked a substantial public awakening of the Armenian consciousness in Soviet Armenia. The Kremlin taking into account the demands of the demonstrators, commissioned a memorial for the genocide and the 1.5 million Armenians who perished. The memorial, on Tsitsernakaberd hill, was completed in 1967, in time for the 53rd anniversary of the beginning of the genocide. The building of the memorial to the fallen of the genocide was the first step in honoring important events and figures in Armenia's long history, for monuments honoring the Armenian victories in Sardarapat and Bash Abaran against the Ottoman Turks in 1918, among others, were later built one after the other.

Following the example of this demonstration , similar protests were made throughout the world by the Armenian diaspora. Since the day of the protests, Armenians (and people from many of the former republics of the Soviet Union and all over the world as well) to this day visit the memorial and make protests around the world to gain acceptance of the Armenian genocide by Turkey and to honor the millions of Armenian deaths during this sad period of Armenian history.

See also 
Armenian genocide
Tsitsernakaberd

References

Further reading

External links 
Armenian Genocide Centennial

1965 in Armenia
Yerevan demonstrations
Armenian genocide commemoration
Armenian Soviet Socialist Republic
Protests in Armenia
Yerevan
Protests in the Soviet Union
1965 protests
20th century in Yerevan
April 1965 events in Europe